Lumiconger arafura, or luminous conger, is a species of eel in the family Congridae. It is the only member of its genus. It is only found in the Indian Ocean off the west coast of Australia at depths of 27–104 meters near the ocean floor.

References

Congridae
Fish described in 1984